The women's luge at the 2006 Winter Olympics began on February 13,  and was completed on February 14 at Cesana Pariol.

Results
Runs 1 and 2 were held on February 13, and runs 3 and 4 on February 14.  The women's luge event was plagued with injury resulting from five separate crashes and many near misses. Kraushaar's silver gave her a complete set of medals earned at the Winter Olympics in women's singles.

References

Women
2006 in women's sport
Women's events at the 2006 Winter Olympics